Michihiko (written: 道彦 or 美知彦) is a masculine Japanese given name. Notable people with the name include:

 (1903–1980), Japanese diarist
 (born 1942), Japanese politician
 (born 1964), Japanese singer and composer

Japanese masculine given names